Elisabeth Hohenwarter is an Austrian mountain bike orienteer. She won a gold medal in the relay at the 2009 World MTB Orienteering Championships in Ben Shemen, together with Sonja Zinkl and Michaela Gigon.

References

External links
 Elisabeth Hohenwarter at World of O Runners

Austrian orienteers
Female orienteers
Austrian female cyclists
Mountain bike orienteers
Living people
Year of birth missing (living people)
21st-century Austrian women